The 1990 Seattle Mariners season was the 14th for the Seattle Mariners in Major League Baseball. It was the second-best record in the M's short history; the win total was one behind the club record set in 1987.

Offseason
 November 13, 1989: Jeff Schaefer was signed as a free agent by the Mariners.
 December 7, 1989: Pete O'Brien was signed as free agent by the Mariners.

Regular season
 June 2: Randy Johnson threw a no-hitter versus the Detroit Tigers, the first for the franchise. He was also the tallest pitcher in Major League history to throw a no-hitter. It was the 2101st game in Mariners history, played on a Saturday night in the Kingdome.
 September 14: Ken Griffey Sr. and Ken Griffey Jr. hit back-to-back home runs in the top of the first inning against the California Angels. Through , it remains the only occurrence of consecutive homers by a father and son in MLB history.

Opening Day starters
 Scott Bankhead
 Greg Briley
 Darnell Coles
 Alvin Davis
 Brian Giles
 Ken Griffey Jr.
 Jeffrey Leonard
 Pete O'Brien
 Harold Reynolds
 Dave Valle

Season standings

Record vs. opponents

Notable transactions
 June 4: 1990 Major League Baseball Draft
Marc Newfield was selected by the Mariners in the first round (sixth pick), and he signed on June 10.
Bret Boone was selected by the M's in the fifth round, and he signed on June 8.
 June 18: Darnell Coles was traded by the Mariners to the Detroit Tigers for Tracy Jones.
 June 19: Mario Díaz was traded by the Seattle Mariners to the New York Mets for Brian Givens.
 August 29: Ken Griffey, Sr. was signed as a free agent by the Mariners.
 September 18: Rick Rentería was released by the Mariners.

Roster

The Griffeys
 Ken Griffey, Sr. joined his son (Ken Griffey Jr.) to become the first father and son to play in a game together. The game was played in the Kingdome against the Kansas City Royals on August 31. The Griffeys became the first father-and-son teammates to hit back-to-back home runs on September 14.

Line Score
August 31, Kingdome, Seattle, Washington

Batting

Pitching

Player stats

Batting

Starters by position
Note: Pos = Position; G = Games played; AB = At bats; H = Hits; Avg. = Batting average; HR = Home runs; RBI = Runs batted in

Other batters
Note: G = Games played; AB = At bats; H = Hits; Avg. = Batting average; HR = Home runs; RBI = Runs batted in

Pitching

Starting pitchers
Note: G = Games pitched; IP = Innings pitched; W = Wins; L = Losses; ERA = Earned run average; SO = Strikeouts

Other pitchers
Note: G = Games pitched; IP = Innings pitched; W = Wins; L = Losses; ERA = Earned run average; SO = Strikeouts

Relief pitchers
Note: G = Games pitched; W = Wins; L = Losses; SV = Saves; ERA = Earned run average; SO = Strikeouts

Farm system

References

External links
1990 Seattle Mariners at Baseball Reference
1990 Seattle Mariners team page at www.baseball-almanac.com

Seattle Mariners seasons
Seattle Mar
Seattle Mariners season